Zavyshen (also Zawisznia) is a village in Ukraine. It is situated in Chervonohrad Raion, Lviv Oblast. This village is situated in the left bank of the Bug. It belongs to Sokal urban hromada, one of the hromadas of Ukraine. The population of village is around 1020 people. Total area of Zavyshen is 2,59 square kilometres. Postal code of this village is 80041.

Until 18 July 2020, Zavyshen belonged to Sokal Raion. The raion was abolished in July 2020 as part of the administrative reform of Ukraine, which reduced the number of raions of Lviv Oblast to seven. The area of Sokal Raion was merged into Chervonohrad Raion.

References

Villages in Chervonohrad Raion